The GSG-5 is a semi-automatic rimfire rifle chambered for the .22 Long Rifle cartridge. It is built by German Sport Guns GmbH, an airsoft wholesaler located in Ense-Höingen, Germany. It was unveiled at the IWA & Outdoor Classics trade show in March 2007 following the legalization of previously forbidden military-style weapons in Germany.

This rifle externally resembles the Heckler & Koch MP5 style submachine gun. German Sport Guns produces its own line of accessories, including retractable stocks and railed handguards. Many airsoft MP5 style accessories may also be used on the GSG-5. Magazines for the GSG-5 are available in 2-round, 10-round, 15-round, 22-round and 110-round drum configurations.

The GSG-5 utilizes the H&K style drum sight that is adjustable for windage. German Sport Guns provides a weaver rail attachment that slides onto the top of the frame, allowing other sighting systems to be added.

Lawsuit

In 2009, Heckler & Koch instituted a lawsuit against German Sport Guns and American Tactical Imports, Inc. over "trade dress infringements." The suit was settled on October 16, 2009, the outcome being that GSG will stop manufacturing the guns and ATI, Inc., will stop importing them. Support will continue for all previously sold rifles. (Heckler and Koch has instituted a spate of lawsuits lately against anyone copying any of the weapons they developed from the CETME, which is itself an outgrowth of the StG 45 assault rifle developed by the Wehrmacht in World War II.)

Fake Suppressor Reclassified

In January 2010, in the United States; the Bureau of Alcohol, Tobacco, Firearms and Explosives  ruled that the previously approved barrel shroud included with the GSG 5 SD to give the cosmetic appearance of a real suppressor (or "silencer") is a true suppressor, despite it being incapable of functioning as a suppressor, and therefore is regulated under the National Firearms Act. ATI, Inc. instituted a recall of the item.

Owners can check to see if their firearm is affected by the recall via this web site

Variants
The GSG-5 is produced in several different versions:

GSG-5 A: With a  barrel.
GSG-5 L: Equipped with a  barrel, designed to meet the legal requirements for minimum barrel length and overall length in several countries (including the United States). The longer barrel is covered with a barrel shroud (mock suppressor) for aesthetic purposes.
GSG-5 SD:Similar to GSG-5 L but with both a larger fore grip and mock suppressor, similar in look to a MP5-SD.  the GSG-5 SD is the subject of the above-mentioned ATF ruling, and owners can check to see if their GSG-5 is affected via this web site.
GSG-5 P: Pistol variant with an endcap instead of a buttstock. Barrel length is identical to the "A" version.
GSG-5 PK: Similar to the GSG-5 P, but with a  barrel and shorter handguard.

References

External links 
German Sports Guns GMBH GSG-5 (Owners Manual)
The GSG fun gun: a rimfire clone of the HK MP-5 - Guns Magazine
Photos of German Sport Guns GSG-5PK

.22 LR semi-automatic rifles